ABC's Nightlife is an American television talk show carried by the American Broadcasting Company (ABC) from November 9, 1964, until November 12, 1965. It was an effort by ABC to compete with The Tonight Show Starring Johnny Carson on NBC.

Initially known as The Les Crane Show, the program had included Crane's exchanges with members of the audience in addition to celebrity guests. Crane's style was described as "informal, highly spontaneous, and often controversial". The show was renamed when Crane left after four months. A revised format used a rotation of stars as hosts, beginning with Shelley Berman. Other hosts included William B. Williams, Nipsey Russell, Jimmy Cannon, Pat Boone, and Allan Sherman. Orchestra leaders were Cy Coleman, Elliot Lawrence, and Donn Trenner. In June 1965, Crane returned as the regular host, accompanied by Russell.

After the series ended, ABC would not return to the late-night television picture until The Joey Bishop Show began in April 1967.

See also
Les Crane#Television

References 

1960s American late-night television series
1964 American television series debuts
1965 American television series endings
ABC late-night programming
English-language television shows
American Broadcasting Company original programming